Thomas P. Gordon is an American politician, law enforcement expert and former County Executive of New Castle County, Delaware. Prior to serving two terms (1997-2004) as New Castle County Executive, Gordon was the Chief of Police for New Castle County. He retired from the Police department in 1997.

Background
Born and raised in Wilmington, DE, Gordon attended Salesianum School, a private Catholic men's high school operated by the Oblates of St. Francis de Sales. He received both his bachelor's and master's degrees from Wilmington University. He is a graduate of the FBI National Academy as well as the United States Secret Service Protection Program.

Before his first run for county executive – promising improved finances, better parks and overhaul of land use laws responsible for out-of-control development in the Bear-Glasgow region—Gordon served in the New Castle County Police Department, rising in its ranks to become  Chief of Police.

Gordon was charged with corruption, racketeering, and mail fraud in May 2004. He and Sherry Freeberry were indicted by a grand jury for, among other things, ordering county employees to work on private political campaigns while on duty.

Fraternal Order of Police & Delaware's Police Officer Bill of Rights
Gordon served as the President of the Fraternal Order of Police (FOP) in Delaware from 1984-1986.  The Law Enforcement Officer Bill of Rights was signed into law on May 13, 1985, during Gordon's term as FOP President.

New Castle County Chief of Police
Gordon began his career in the public sector upon joining the New Castle County Police Department in 1975. As a police officer he was assigned to the Patrol Division Criminal Unit, as well as the Attorney General's White Collar Crime Unit. Gordon was promoted to Sergeant in 1980, Lieutenant in 1984, and Captain in 1988. Gordon was Co-commander of Delaware's first serial killer task force which led to the apprehension and prosecution of Steven Brian Pennell, the state's first and only known serial killer.

The U.S. Crime Bill
Gordon worked closely with then Senator Joseph Biden in the creation and writing of the landmark U.S. Crime Bill  which was signed into law by President Bill Clinton in 1994. The Violent Crime Control and Law Enforcement Act was the largest of its kind in US history and widely regarded as the most successful. Since implementation, violent and property crime in the United States has declined 43% and 37% respectively.

2016 Election
Gordon was defeated in the 2016 Democratic Primary by Matt Meyer.

Gordon would have been the first forth term County Executive in the history of New Castle County.

Notes

External links
 County Executive Tom Gordon-New Castle County, Delaware

1952 births
New Castle County Executives
Delaware Democrats
Living people
People from Wilmington, Delaware
Wilmington University alumni
Salesianum School alumni